Zieria verrucosa is a plant in the citrus family Rutaceae and is endemic to a small area of Queensland. It is a densely-branched, hairy shrub with three-part, clover-like leaves and large groups of creamy-white to pink, four-petalled flowers.

Description
The upper surface of the leaflets is dark green with scattered hairs and the lower surface is whitish and velvety-hairy. The leaves are covered with glands and many small lumps or tubercules and are strongly scented, especially when crushed. The flowers are arranged in the leaf axils in groups of up to 60 but the flowers are small and the groups are shorter than the leaves. Flowering occurs between August and February and the fruits which follow are glabrous capsules with many glands.

Taxonomy and naming
Zieria verrucosa was first formally described in 2002 by James Armstrong and the description was published in Australian Systematic Botany. The specific epithet (verrucosa) is a Latin word meaning "full of warts".

Distribution and habitat
This zieria is only known from a small area near Mundubbera where it grows in vine thicket, Eucalyptus crebra or ironbark woodland.

Conservation
Zieria verrucosa is listed as "Vulnerable" under the Commonwealth Government Environment Protection and Biodiversity Conservation Act 1999 (EPBC) Act and under the Queensland Nature Conservation Act 1992. The main threats to the species are land clearing, cattle grazing and inappropriate fire regimes.

References

verrucosa
Sapindales of Australia
Flora of New South Wales
Plants described in 2002